Madwala Wildlife Sanctuary is a 102 hectare nature reserve in Assagay, Outer West Durban, South Africa.  The reserve is managed by the eThekwini Municipality and is home to a number of mammals and birds.

Working for Water, an initiative of the South African government's Department of Water Affairs, is working to remove invasive alien plants from the area.

References 

Nature reserves in South Africa